Misha Verbitsky (born June 20, 1969 in Moscow) is a Russian mathematician. He works at the Instituto Nacional de Matemática Pura e Aplicada in Rio de Janeiro. He is primarily known to the general public as a controversial critic, political activist and independent music publisher.

Scientific activities 
Verbitsky graduated from a Math class at the Moscow State School 57 in 1986, and has been active in mathematics since then. His principal area of interest in mathematics is differential geometry, especially geometry of hyperkähler manifolds and locally conformally Kähler manifolds. He proved an analogue of the global Torelli theorem for hyperkähler manifolds and the mirror conjecture in hyperkähler case. He also contributed to the theory of Hodge structures. His PhD thesis, titled Cohomology of compact Hyperkaehler Manifolds, was defended in 1995 at Harvard University under the supervision of David Kazhdan. He has held different positions, most prominently at the Independent University of Moscow (since 1996), the University of Glasgow (2002–2007), and the HSE Faculty of Mathematics (since 2010). He currently works at IMPA in Rio de Janeiro.

Lenin
Verbitsky's webzine :LENIN:, started around 1997, is one of the oldest Russian online projects and has been hugely influential in the shaping of Russian counter-culture. It was the first website in Russian to openly discuss topics considered taboo at the time, such as pornography and Right-wing extremism, and to create a milieu for the emerging counter-culture aesthetic. The site also contains the largest single collection of rare underground music from the ex-USSR and contemporary Russia.

Western counter-culture
While studying mathematics at Harvard University in the early 90s, Verbitsky was heavily influenced by Western counter-culture, especially Thelema and industrial music, and was the first to introduce these concepts to post-Soviet Russia via his webzine. At the same time, Verbitsky developed his political views which can be described as a mixture of Social Darwinism, National Bolshevism and Anarchism. He is also a prominent supporter of the anti-copyright movement, and has given lectures on the subject at various locations, including Oxford University. His work Anticopyright: The Book is the only Russian publication placing concepts such as open source and copyleft into historical and cultural context.

National Bolshevik Party
After graduating from Harvard with a PhD, Verbitsky moved to Russia and became a close associate (though not a member) of Eduard Limonov's National Bolshevik Party. His articles were published in a variety of newspapers and magazines, including Russkij Zhurnal, Zhurnal.Ru, Zavtra and Limonka. When the National Bolsheviks split in 1998, he joined the Eurasia Party of Alexandr Dugin. Verbitsky has given numerous talks at the Novyi Universitet, Dugin's educational vehicle, and contributed to a variety of his publications such as Elementy and Vtorzhenie.

Writing style
Verbitsky's provocative writing style can be described as both aggressive and ironic, a mixture of gonzo journalism, profanity and surreal exaggeration which instantly captures the reader's attention. The critical response to his writings ranges from anger and disgust to fascination and widespread imitation (for example, his catchphrases "So it goes, Misha" and "Kill, Kill, Kill" have been plagiarised all over the Russian web).

Ur-Realist Records
In 1998, Verbitsky founded the independent label UR-Realist Records to publish experimental and controversial underground music. Since then, over 40 albums have been released, including those of punk legend Grazhdanskaya Oborona and the neofolk band Rada i Ternovnik.

Personal life
Verbitsky currently lives in Rio de Janeiro and teaches at IMPA.

In December 2009, Yuri Kuklachev, the founder of the Moscow Cat Theatre, filled a defamation lawsuit against Verbitsky. Kuklachev was seeking to recover alleged damages caused by Verbitsky quoting previously published allegations of Kuklachev's animal cruelty in one of his blog posts; moreover, Kuklachev holds Verbitsky responsible for the expletive-ridden content of anonymous comments to the post in question.

In 2012, Verbitsky was convicted without his knowledge of copyright infringement. He had posted a photograph of a Russian politician who claims that his beard is trademarked. The case has been appealed.

Bibliography
 Anticopyright: The Book (2002)
 :LENIN: an offering to Gods Unknown webzine
 Against Culture + Pt. 2
 Chaos and Underground Culture

References

External links

List of publications in Russ.ru
Biography at Marat Guelman's art page 

1969 births
Counterculture of the 1990s
Living people
Writers from Moscow
Russian Jews
Harvard University alumni
Intellectual property activism
National Bolsheviks
Russian bloggers
Russian mathematicians
Russian Thelemites
Differential geometers
Academic staff of the Higher School of Economics
Soviet mathematicians
Instituto Nacional de Matemática Pura e Aplicada researchers
Academics of the University of Glasgow
Academic staff of the Independent University of Moscow